Megacephala ertli is a species of tiger beetle in the subfamily Cicindelinae that was described by W. Horn in 1904.

References

ertli
Beetles described in 1904